The National Futures Association (NFA) is the self-regulatory organization (SRO) for the U.S. derivatives industry, including on-exchange traded futures, retail off-exchange foreign currency (forex) and OTC derivatives (swaps).  NFA is headquartered in Chicago and maintains an office in New York City. NFA is a non-profit, independent regulatory organization. NFA does not operate any markets and is not a trade association. NFA is financed from membership dues and assessment fees, and membership is mandatory for many market participants.

History
The National Futures Association (NFA) was created by the Commodity Futures Trading Commission (CFTC) in September 1981 and began regulatory operations in 1982.

Responsibilities
NFA chief responsibilities include registering firms and individuals who want to do business in the derivatives industry, monitoring trades, taking disciplinary actions against members who don't follow the rules, creating rules and best practices, providing member education through workshops, webinars and conferences, mediating member and customer disputes, and providing investor education and protection.

Member News and Notices
One of the NFA's main functions is to provide up-to-date information to all member, subscribers, investors and the regulators. The NFA News section provides links to the latest NFA enforcement actions, press releases, notices to members, updated rule submissions, testimonies and more.

Governance 
The NFA is governed by a board of directors. The Board meets four times a year. NFA's board also elects individuals for NFA Committees.

References

External Articles
New Outsourced Compliance Guidance – Implications for CFTC-Registered Private Fund Managers at JDSupra
July 7, 2021: NFA Adopts CPO Reporting Requirement for Distress Events: Compliance Rule 2-50 in effect as of June 30, 2021

Regulators
Auditors